Amor mío is a Mexican telenovela produced by Roberto Gómez Fernández and Giselle González for Televisa. The series is an adaptation of the Argentine telenovela of the same name created by Romina Yan & Cris Morena. Vanessa Guzmán and Raúl Araiza star as the protagonists, while Rosa Maria Bianchi and Manuel "Flaco" Ibáñez star as the co-protagonists.

Plot 
The story revolves around Abril and Marcos, two people with completely opposite personalities. She is restless, outgoing, cheerful, as he is a lover of order, tranquility and a home life that loves having people encounters of the second kind. Living together is not easy and is worse when both try to hide the attraction that arises between them.

Series overview

Cast 
  Vanessa Guzmán as Abril Juárez Casallego
  Raúl Araiza as Marcos Sinclair
  Manuel "Flaco" Ibáñez as Andrés Sinclair
  Rosa María Bianchi as Maggie Casallego vda. de Juárez
  Ricardo Fastlicht as Felipe Gómez
  Verónica Jaspeado as Vera Esmeralda
  Juan Carlos Colombo as Ricardo Saenz/Augusto Monrraz 
  Nora Velázquez as Sara Parra Andaluz
  Uberto Bondoni as Santiago Legorreta
  Marcela Ferradás as Inés Ibañez
  Wendy González as Violeta Sinclair
  Thaly Amezcua as Betty
  Masaya Candelario as Leila
  Patricio Borghetti as Javier Martínez Andaluz
  Isabel Macedo as Daniela Sánchez

References

External links 
 

2006 telenovelas
Mexican telenovelas
2006 Mexican television series debuts
2008 Mexican television series endings
Televisa telenovelas
Mexican television series based on Argentine television series
Spanish-language telenovelas